Amerish Babulal "Ami" Bera (born March 2, 1965) is an American physician and politician serving as the U.S. representative for  since 2013 (known as the 7th congressional district until 2023). A member of the Democratic Party, his district encompasses most of Sacramento's eastern and southern suburbs, including Elk Grove, Folsom, and Rancho Cordova.

Early life, education, and career
Bera's father, Babulal Bera, immigrated to the United States from India in 1958. Two years later, Babulal Bera was joined by his wife, Kanta. Ami Bera was born in Los Angeles and raised in the Orange County city of La Palma. He attended John F. Kennedy High School while living there. Bera's parents are from Rajkot, Gujarat, and he can understand Gujarati.

Bera has a bachelor's degree in biological sciences from the University of California, Irvine, also earning his Doctor of Medicine degree there in 1991. From 1997 to 1999 he was the medical director of Care Management at the Mercy Healthcare for Sacramento. He served as the chief medical officer for the County of Sacramento and later as the associate dean for admissions at the UC Davis School of Medicine. From 2005 to 2012, he served as a clinical professor at the University of California Davis School of Medicine.

U.S. House of Representatives

Elections

2010 

He ran unopposed for the Democratic nomination. He raised more money than Lungren for the five quarters through mid-2010, making him the only Democratic challenger with more cash than a sitting Republican member of the House. Bera was one of 17 candidates the Democratic Congressional Campaign Committee targeted to take over Republican-held or open seats in 2010.

Lungren was the only incumbent Republican whose race was rated a "tossup" by CQ Politics, but it was rerated "Lean GOP" in the campaign's final days, and the race was considered competitive by both parties. Polling by Daily Kos in September showed Lungren leading Bera, 46%–38%. Bera cited health care, education and economic recovery among his top legislative priorities. In November, Lungren won reelection, defeating Bera 51%–43%.

In 2010, after Bera accepted a $250 donation from Basim Elkarra, executive director of the Sacramento chapter of the Council on American-Islamic Relations (CAIR), the California Republican Party called on him to return the money. Bera returned the money after these concerns were raised.

2012 

Bera announced a rematch against Lungren in 2012. The district had been renumbered the 7th district, and made somewhat more compact. It lost all of its territory outside of Sacramento County, making it slightly friendlier to Democrats.

On November 13, 2012, Bera attended freshman orientation as congressman-elect while votes were still being counted. Candidates in these tight races sometimes attend the orientation by the Committee on House Administration, whose chairman was Bera's opponent, Lungren.

On November 15, 2012, the Associated Press called the race for Bera, who won 51%–49%.

2014 
Bera ran for reelection in 2014, facing former Republican congressman Doug Ose, who had represented what was then the 3rd from 1999 to 2005. The Rothenberg Political Report rated the 7th district "Lean Democratic," but The Sacramento Bee reported that Bera was "viewed by both parties as one of the most vulnerable Democrats in the country." Bera was a member of the Democratic Congressional Campaign Committee's Frontline program, designed to support vulnerable candidates. In June 2014, Politico reported that the DCCC planned to support Bera with $1.7 million in ads throughout fall 2014, and the House Majority PAC, a political action committee designed to support Democratic candidates, reserved $200,000 for late-election television ads.

The Hill reported that Bera's campaign received donations from parents of another Democratic candidate, Kevin Strouse, only to have Bera's parents then donate a similar amount to Strouse's campaign. According to The Philadelphia Inquirer, "The donations appear legal, campaign finance experts say, though two said any agreement among the parents to trade donations could be viewed as an attempted end run around contribution limits." In May 2016, Bera's father, Babulal, pleaded guilty to two felony counts of elections fraud.

No Labels co-founder and former George W. Bush advisor Mark McKinnon said of Bera, "He is the most important member of our Problem Solvers—of the entire group. He stepped up immediately as a freshman to take a leadership position. He was out early advocating on our big issues like No Budget, No Pay.”

In response to a poll by the American Sikh Committee to Evaluate Congressional Candidates, Bera did not answer two questions about the Indian government's part in the 1984 anti-Sikh riots in which 8,000 Sikhs were massacred after Indian Prime Minister Indira Gandhi's assassination. Instead, he noted that in 2005, Indian Prime Minister Manmohan Singh had publicly apologized to the Sikh community for the government's role. Bera also stated that, while it was a tragedy, he was more focused on the treatment of Sikhs in the U.S. and could not dictate how the Indian government should approach the matter. In response, some members of the Sikh-American community, and some PACs representing them, publicly withdrew their support for Bera. But with the majority of the Sikh-American population coming from outside of Bera's district, the advocates acknowledged that they were unlikely to affect the outcome of the race.

On election night, Bera "was down by more than 3,000 votes...but came back to win after all the absentee and mail-in ballots were in." In the end, he won 50.4% of the vote to Ose's 49.6%.

2016 

Bera ran for reelection in 2016. He faced Republican Sacramento County Sheriff Scott Jones in the general election. In January 2016, the Elk Grove-South County Democratic Club, Bera's home club, voted against endorsing him, citing concerns with his record on trade and Syrian refugees.

Bera's 2016 race was "one of the nastiest Congressional races with allegations and insinuations being bandied back and forth" and was also "one of the last two House races in the entire nation yet to be called." As he began his third term, he was joined by three new Indian-American House members: Raja Krishnamoorthi from Illinois, Pramila Jayapal from Washington, and Ro Khanna from California. Silicon Valley entrepreneur M. R. Rangaswami said Bera "was the first Indian American to be in Congress in a long time and now can actually lead a Caucus...able to shepherd Pramila, Raja and Ro and get them going during their freshman year."

A coalition of dissatisfied groups prevented Bera from garnering his party's endorsement in January, but at the state Democratic convention in February, he was endorsed, with 90% of the delegates voting to endorse.

During the 2016 campaign Bera's father, Babulal Bera, was sentenced to one year and one day in federal prison, and fined $100,200, for federal campaign finance violations that helped fund two of his sons' campaigns.

Bera narrowly defeated Jones in the general election, with 51% of the vote to Jones's 49%. The margin of victory was 4,802 votes.

Since 2016, which saw the election to the House of three other Indian-Americans and to the Senate of the first Indian-American Senator, Kamala Devi Harris, Bera has been described as the "Godfather" of Indian-Americans on Capitol Hill.

2018 

In 2018, Bera was reelected, garnering 155,016 votes (55%) and defeating Republican Andrew Grant, a former U.S. Department of State official, who received 126,601 (45%).

2020 

In 2020, Bera was reelected, garnering 217,416 votes (56%) and defeating Republican Buzz Patterson, a retired United States Air Force Lieutenant Colonel who received 166,549 (43%).

Tenure
In an interview covered in the Elk Grove Citizen, Bera said his first year in Congress "was about being focused here in the district but also building my reputation in Washington, D.C."

In October 2013, Bera announced that he would give up his federal pay for the duration of the government shutdown. He also announced that in response to sequester cuts, he would donate 8.2% of his check each month to local organizations affected by sequester cuts.

In a 2015 op-ed supporting the Trans-Pacific Partnership in the Sacramento Bee, Bera copied several sentences from documents produced by the Business Roundtable and Third Way and from an Obama White House report. He received criticism, including from labor groups like the California Labor Federation, for parroting lobbying firms. Bera later wrote an apology, though he stood by the sentiment of the op-ed.

As of October 2021, Bera had voted in line with Joe Biden's stated position 100% of the time.

In 2022, Bera was bitten by a rabid fox on Capitol Hill and received the appropriate shots. Coinciding with World Rabies Day, Bera introduced legislation, the Affordable Rabies Treatment for Uninsured Act, which would create a government program that would reimburse health care providers who administer the treatment to people who are uninsured. A five-shot regimen of rabies immunoglobulin and rabies vaccine can cost over $5,000.

Environment
According to The Hill in 2014, "Bera, who faces a tough race this fall against Republican Doug Ose, is a strong advocate for tackling climate change, but global warming isn't his focus when he talks about the drought with constituents."

Health care
Bera supports the Affordable Care Act (Obamacare) and has voted against repeal efforts .

Syrian refugees
On November 19, 2015, Bera voted for HR 4038, legislation that would effectively halt the resettlement of refugees from Syria and Iraq to the United States.

Pakistan and terrorism
In 2016, Bera called on the Pakistani government "to take responsibility and start cracking down" on terrorists based in its country, and praised the Indian government for its restraint in the face of a recent attack on an Indian air force base by Pakistan-based militants.

India–U.S. relations
Bera called a June 2016 speech by Indian prime minister Narendra Modi to a joint session of the U.S. Congress "the perfect speech for this moment in time" and claimed that India was becoming "a global leader and a global partner with the United States." "As an Indian American and a Gujarati American," Bera said, "I was thrilled by the prime minister's speech."

Taxes

In 2017 Bera voted against the Tax Cuts and Jobs Act of 2017.

Big Tech
In 2022, Bera was one of 16 Democrats to vote against the Merger Filing Fee Modernization Act of 2022, an antitrust package that would crack down on corporations for anti-competitive behavior.

Committee assignments

 Committee on Foreign Affairs
Subcommittee on Africa, Global Health and Global Human Rights
Subcommittee on Asia, the Pacific, Central Asia and Nonproliferation (Chair)
 Committee on Science, Space and Technology
 Subcommittee on Investigations and Oversight
 Subcommittee on Space and Aeronautics

In February 2017, Bera was elected ranking member of the House space subcommittee by House Democrats. His district includes a major Aerojet Rocketdyne facility, east of Sacramento.

Caucus memberships

 American Sikh Congressional Caucus
 New Democrat Coalition (vice chair of outreach)
 Congressional Asian Pacific American Caucus
 Climate Solutions Caucus
U.S.-Japan Caucus

Political positions

Abortion

As of 2016, Bera had a 100% rating from NARAL Pro-Choice America, which called him a "pro-choice champion". He opposed the overturning of Roe v. Wade, calling it a "blow to women's rights and reproductive health care".

Personal life
Bera and his wife, Janine Bera, have one child. They reside in Elk Grove, California.

On April 4, 2022, Bera was one of nine people attacked by a rabid fox outside the US Capitol. He said afterward, '"I expect to get attacked if I go on Fox News; I don't expect to get attacked by a fox."

Bera is one of three Unitarian Universalists in Congress.

Electoral history 

https://elections.cdn.sos.ca.gov/sov/2018-general/sov/07-summary.pdf
https://elections.cdn.sos.ca.gov/sov/2018-general/sov/07-summary.pdf

See also
 Physicians in the United States Congress
 List of Asian Americans and Pacific Islands Americans in the United States Congress

References

External links

 Congressman Ami Bera official U.S. House website
 Ami Bera for Congress campaign website
 
 

|-

1965 births
20th-century American physicians
20th-century Unitarians
21st-century American politicians
21st-century Unitarians
American politicians of Indian descent
California politicians of Indian descent
American people of Indian descent in health professions
American people of Gujarati descent
American healthcare managers
American Unitarian Universalists
Candidates in the 2010 United States elections
Gujarati people
Living people
Members of the United States Congress of Indian descent
Democratic Party members of the United States House of Representatives from California
Asian-American members of the United States House of Representatives
People from Elk Grove, California
People from La Palma, California
Physicians from California
University of California, Irvine alumni